Whitworth Hall Country Park is a parkland based set in   from Durham in England, which rests on the outskirts of the town of Spennymoor in County Durham.

The park includes Whitworth Hall, a Grade II listed stately mansion (the ancestral home of Bobby Shafto an 18th-century MP) hotel, deer park, lake and Shafto's Inn. The park includes a Victorian walled garden which contains England's most northerly vineyard.  The current building was rebuilt in the 19th century.

External links
 Official site
 Official England tourism site

Country parks in County Durham
Spennymoor